Alok Sharma (born 27 June 1961) is an Indian neuroscientist. He is the President of the Indian Society of Regenerative Science  and director of Neurogen Brain and Spine Institute, Mumbai.

Early life and education
Sharma earned his MBBS, MS (general surgery) and MCh (neurosurgery) from King Edward Memorial Hospital and Seth Gordhandas Sunderdas Medical College of Mumbai University.

In 1995, he completed a fellowship in Steriotactic and Functional Neurosurgery and Gamma knife Therapy at the Karolinska University Hospital and in 1998, he completed another fellowship in neurotransplantation at the University of Colorado Health Sciences Center.

Professional experience
Sharma is currently the  Indian Society of Regenerative Science (formerly known as the Stem Cell Society of India) and Vice President, International Association of Neurorestoratology (IANR).  He is also the Director of NeuroGen Brain & Spine Institute & Professor & Head of Department - Neurosurgery, at Lokmanya Tilak Municipal General Hospital and Lokmanya Tilak Municipal Medical College, Mumbai, India.

He is an internationally recognised Indian neurosurgeon, who has 144 scientific publications to his name in the field of stem cell therapy and 54 publications on other neurology related topics.

Awards and recognition

"Bharat Gaurav" award for Distinguished Services to the Nation & Outstanding Individual Achievements at the House of Commons of the British Parliament in London, UK.

Coveted Sushrut Award in 2010, at Mumbai by the Red Swastik Society, for commendable or exemplary work in the field of Surgery-cum-Community Service.

"Excellence in services in stem cell therapy" by ‘Times health excellence award’ at the hands notable Indian oncologist.Suresh H. Advani.

References

1961 births
Living people
Indian neuroscientists
Indian neurosurgeons
Medical doctors from Mumbai
21st-century Indian medical doctors
University of Mumbai alumni